George Briggs (May 6, 1805 – June 1, 1869) was an American politician and a United States Representative from New York.

Biography
Born near Broadalbin, Fulton County, New York Briggs moved to Vermont in 1812 with his parents, who settled in Bennington. He attended the public schools.

Career
Biggs engaged in business as a dealer in hardware and was a member of the Vermont House of Representatives in 1837. He returned to New York, settling in New York City in 1838 and continuing in the hardware business.

Elected as a Whig to the 31st and 32nd United States Congresses, Biggs was United States Representative for the fifth district of New York from March 4, 1849, to March 3, 1853. He declined to be a candidate for renomination in 1852.

Briggs was then elected as a Republican to the 36th United States Congress, and was United States Representative for the seventh district of New York from March 4, 1859, to March 3, 1861. During the thirty-sixth Congress, he was Chairman of the Committee on Revolutionary Claims. He declined to be a candidate for renomination in 1860 and retired. In 1866 he was a delegate to the National Union Convention at Philadelphia.

Death
Briggs died at his summer home, "Woodlawn," at Saratoga Springs, Saratoga County, New York, on June 1, 1869 (age 64 years, 26 days). He is interment was in Greenwood Cemetery, Brooklyn, New York.

References

External links

The Political Graveyard
Govtrack US Congress

1805 births
1869 deaths
Members of the Vermont House of Representatives
New York (state) Whigs
Burials at Green-Wood Cemetery
People from Bennington, Vermont
Politicians from Saratoga Springs, New York
People from Broadalbin, New York
Whig Party members of the United States House of Representatives
Republican Party members of the United States House of Representatives from New York (state)
19th-century American politicians